Microgenia is the medical term for an unusually small or deformed chin.

The contrasting condition, an enlarged chin, is called "macrogenia".

Causes
Can occur in anyone, but is often a sign of Down syndrome.

References

Congenital disorders of eye, ear, face and neck